is an action role-playing video game developed by Creatures Inc., published by The Pokémon Company and distributed by Nintendo for the Nintendo DS video game console.

It was announced in the January 2008 issue of CoroCoro and was released in Japan on March 20, 2008. It was announced at E3 2008 that the game would be released in the United States under the title Shadows of Almia on November 10, 2008. It was announced on September 25 that the game would be released in Europe under the title Shadows of Almia on November 21, 2008. It was released on the European Wii U Virtual Console on June 9, 2016, and was released on the North American Wii U Virtual Console on August 4, 2016.

The game features 270 Pokémon, including new Pokémon which were not featured in the original Pokémon Ranger, from Pokémon Diamond and Pearl. The game utilized the Nintendo Wi-Fi Connection to download new missions.

Gameplay
The game takes place in the Almia region. The player begins as a Pokémon ranger-in-training at the Ranger School and quickly graduates to a rookie Ranger and must advance from there.  The player may choose their character's gender, but unlike in the original Pokémon Ranger, this choice does not affect their partner Pokémon.

Much of the gameplay is similar to the original game. Players must capture/befriend wild Pokémon to aid them by circling them with their Nintendo DS stylus (known as a Capture Styler in the game).

There is a major change from the original capture method.  Instead of having to complete certain number of loops without lifting the stylus, the player must fill up a Pokémon's Friendship Gauge by drawing loops around the Pokémon, but can lift the stylus to avoid attacks.  However, the power in Friendship Gauge will decrease over time if the player stops drawing loops for too long.  The amount of power in the gauge filled by each loop increases as the player levels up the styler.

Shadows of Almia also introduces Quests, which are mini-missions not essential to the plot that involve the player completing requests from Almia citizens, earning new partner Pokémon and power-ups (such as resistance to attacks or longer capture lines) for their styler as rewards.

Unlike the original, Shadows of Almia allows the player to choose their partner Pokémon.  In the previous game, the partner was decided based on the players chosen gender (Minun for male, Plusle for female). Players start with either Pachirisu, Munchlax, or Starly, and the other 14 partners (as well as the two partners that were not chosen at the beginning) are obtainable either through sub-quests or in-game events, and once captured, can be switched to be the player's partner at any time. There are 17 possible partners, one for each of the Pokémon types that existed at the time.

Shadows of Almia also includes 4 different types of stylers: the School, Capture, Fine and Vatonage stylers. The School styler is a simplified version of the capture styler, while the Fine Styler has a charge feature (which can be upgraded) which activates when the styler is held down, increasing the amount of feelings conveyed to the Pokémon and enabling quicker captures. The Vatonage styler is a unique Fine Styler that can capture Team Dim Sun's Pokémon instead of merely releasing them.

Synopsis

Setting
This game takes place in a new region - , far from all other regions encountered in other games. The Fiore region is an exception, however. It is mentioned frequently in Almia. Almia has a widely varied landscape, everything from the hot Haruba Desert to the chilly Hia Valley.

Plot

The game starts at the Ranger School, with the player enrolling as a student after expertly capturing a Pikachu. The player quickly makes friends with two of their classmates, Rhythmi who dreams of being an Operator, and Keith, a rival, who dreams of becoming a Top Ranger. After the player and Keith nearly discover what Mr. Kincaid, a teacher, is doing in the basement, Mr. Kincaid seals it off from all students. Both the player and Keith show strong potential as Rangers, and graduate with full honors after defeating two Tangrowth at their graduation ceremony. The player stays in Almia, while Keith and Rhythmi go to Fiore as part of their training. The player's family moves into a nearby town known as Chicole Village, and the player goes to live with them.

During this time, an evil group emerges in Almia known as Team Dim Sun. Dim Sun uses machines called Miniremos and Gigaremos to control Pokémon for their own use.

The player becomes an Area Ranger, helping out the people of Vientown, and receives a partner Pokémon by befriending it. The player receives their first major mission soon after: Patrolling a nearby cave. In this cave, strange Pokémon under mind control are found and rescued, with the source of their control being a (not known at the time) Gigaremo unit. The player comes back from Ranger HQ after talking about the Gigaremo, when a forest fire soon breaks out in Vien Forest. After stopping the fire with a Blastoise, the player gains access to the town on the other side, Pueltown.

The player's next big mission is to locate the leader of the Area Rangers-Barlow, who was last seen leaving to investigate disturbances on the volcanic isle of Boyleland. After exploring Boyle Volcano, the player captures two of Team Dim Sun's guards, who tell him that Barlow is on their large ship used to transport Pokémon. The player runs after the ship, and after finding Barlow, they confront the leader, Mr. Kincaid, who was a leader of Dim Sun. Kincaid deploys a Drapion to deal with the Rangers, and is defeated. Kincaid orders the ship to be submerged, which the player prevents, and Kincaid flees. Barlow steers the ship into the yard of the Ranger Academy, where the mission is declared a success.

The player is promoted to the rank of Top Ranger and gains the use of the Fine Styler. Their first mission is to help Sven, another Top Ranger, investigate a Dim Sun mining operation in the Chroma Ruins. They discover that Dim Sun is looking for Dark Crystals to power their Gigaremo and Miniremo units. They also find a hole where a large Shadow Crystal was once held, and a Diary written by the late Brighton Hall, the previous president of Altru Inc; the mining site is discovered to be the ruins of the site where Doyle Hall, the company's founder, first began prospecting for new energy sources. While examining the Dark Crystal, the Rangers discover that the effects of these crystals can be nullified by shards of three gems known as the Tears of Princes.

The player and Keith go on to separately collect the sources of these shards; the blue gem from Almia Castle, the red gem from Boyle Volcano, and the yellow gem from Hippowdon Temple. Although the player takes both the blue and red gems, Keith is captured by Dim Sun, which uses him to blackmail the player into surrendering the yellow gem. Meanwhile, Sven raids Dim Sun's undersea base, stealing plans for an "Incredible Machine". With the aid of Isaac, a former classmate of the player and Kincaid's unwitting protege, it is discovered that the plans are for Altru Inc.'s tower, which is actually a massive Gigaremo powered by the Shadow Crystal. With this revelation, it is realized that Altru Inc. is behind Team Dim Sun's activities.

Immediately after this realization, the Sinis Trio — three Dim Sun agents serving Blake Hall, Altru's president — attack the Ranger Union headquarters. They bribe Isaac into returning to save his sister. After the player and Keith defeat Blake's deputy Wheeler, the leaders of the Ranger Union plan an all out strike on Altru Tower, known as Operation Brighton. The two top rangers circle the headquarters, while Keith and the player would charge the tower, find the Yellow gem, rescue Isaac, and destroy the barrier. After this is accomplished, the player confronts Blake on the top of the tower, too late to prevent its full activation. With the Shadow Crystal's power, Blake summons a Dusknoir from Hippowdon Temple, but the player captures it and defeats Wheeler once more. Pushing the Incredible Machine into the unsafe "Level Dark", Blake summons Darkrai, the Shadow Crystal's protector; driven mad by the Incredible Machine, Darkrai breaks free from Blake's control, consumes him and Wheeler in a Dark Void, and goes on a rampage. The player uses the power of the Tears of Princes linked with their Styler to capture Darkrai and save Blake, which turns the Shadow Crystal into the Luminous Crystal, ending the mission. Professor Hastings arrives and reveals that Blake was born Wyatt Hall, and Brighton offered him to the Shadow Crystal and changed his name, a mistake Brighton came to regret when Blake drove him from Altru. Remorseful for his actions, Blake surrenders to Hastings and is taken to face justice.

Peace returns to Almia and its inhabitants, and the characters enjoy a concert originally planned for Altru (played by the Go-Rock Quads from the original Pokémon Ranger) while the player returns home to his family. The game ends showing Darkrai circling the Luminous Crystal. In an epilogue mission, Kincaid reorganizes the remnants of Team Dim Sun under his own leadership. Now dubbed Team Debonairs, the revived organization attempts to revert the Luminous Crystal back into the Shadow Crystal by removing the Tears of Princes from their positions around it. With Darkrai's aid, the player thwarts Team Debonairs, ends Kincaid's ambitions and ensures a peaceful future for all of Almia.

Reception

Shadows of Almia has received mostly mixed reviews, with a score of 68 on Metacritic.  GameSpot gave the title a 7.5 out of 10 rating, stating that "Pokémon Ranger: Shadows of Almia improves upon its predecessor just enough to make it a fun, solid addition to the spin-off series.". Eurogamer gave Shadows of Almia a 6 out of 10 rating, stating that "With a long wait until the next proper Pokémon game, many fans may feel that's enough, but they shouldn't expect anything more than a mild distraction." 1UP gave the title a C+ rating, stating that "While it's nowhere near as addictive as the regular color-coded Pokémon games, Almia's still a decent diversion -- I just wish the story offered something a little deeper." IGN gave the title a rating of 6.7 out of 10, stating that "Unless you're addicted to scribbling circles like that creepy boy from The Ring, or you're some sort of hippie that only likes playing humane non-battling Pokémon games, you could probably pass on this and be just fine."  As of July 9, 2008, the game has sold 576,467 copies in Japan, according to Famitsu. It is also the 13th best-selling game of Japan in 2008. It was the sixth best-selling game of December 2008 in the United States.

See also

Pokémon Ranger
Pokémon Ranger: Guardian Signs

References

External links
Official website
https://bulbapedia.bulbagarden.net/wiki/Pok%C3%A9mon_Ranger:_Shadows_of_Almia

2008 video games
Action role-playing video games
Nintendo DS games
Role-playing video games
Video game sequels
Video games featuring protagonists of selectable gender
Video games developed in Japan
Virtual Console games
Virtual Console games for Wii U
Ranger

ja:ポケモンレンジャー#ポケモンレンジャー バトナージ